Trini Alonso (1923–2000) was a Spanish film actress.

Selected filmography
 Spanish Fantasy (1953)
 Maribel and the Strange Family (1960)
 Tomy's Secret (1963)
 Stop at Tenerife (1964)
 Weekend, Italian Style (1966)
 The Wild Ones of San Gil Bridge (1966)
 Variety (1971)

References

Bibliography 
 Peter Cowie & Derek Elley. World Filmography: 1967. Fairleigh Dickinson University Press, 1977.

External links 
 

1923 births
2000 deaths
Spanish film actresses
People from Santander, Spain
20th-century Spanish actresses